The 2020 Texas State Bobcats baseball team represented Texas State University in the 2020 NCAA Division I baseball season. The Bobcats played their home games at Bobcat Ballpark and were led by first year head coach Steven Trout.

On March 12, the Sun Belt Conference announced the indefinite suspension of all spring athletics, including baseball, due to the increasing risk of the COVID-19 pandemic. Soon after, the Sun Belt cancelled all season and postseason play.

Preseason

Signing Day Recruits

Sun Belt Conference Coaches Poll
The Sun Belt Conference Coaches Poll will be released sometime around January 30, 2020 and the Bobcats were picked to finish third in the West Division and tied for fourth overall in the conference.

Preseason All-Sun Belt Team & Honors
Drake Nightengale (USA, Sr, Pitcher)
Zach McCambley (CCU, Jr, Pitcher)
Levi Thomas (TROY, Jr, Pitcher)
Andrew Papp (APP, Sr, Pitcher)
Jack Jumper (ARST, Sr, Pitcher)
Kale Emshoff (LR, RS-Jr, Catcher)
Kaleb DeLatorre (USA, Sr, First Base)
Luke Drumheller (APP, So, Second Base)
Hayden Cantrelle (LA, Jr, Shortstop)
Garrett Scott (LR, RS-Sr, Third Base)
Mason McWhorter (GASO, Sr, Outfielder)
Ethan Wilson (USA, So, Outfielder)
Rigsby Mosley (TROY, Jr, Outfielder)
Will Hollis (TXST, Sr, Designated Hitter)
Andrew Beesley (ULM, Sr, Utility)

Roster

Coaching staff

Schedule and results

Schedule Source:
*Rankings are based on the team's current ranking in the D1Baseball poll.

References

Texas State
Texas State Bobcats baseball seasons
Texas State Bobcats baseball